Giovanni Sanfelice was a Roman Catholic prelate who served as Bishop of Muro Lucano (1423–1443) 
and Bishop of Alessano (1405–1423).

Biography
On 12 October 1405, Giovanni Sanfelice was appointed during the papacy of Pope Innocent VII as Bishop of Alessano.
On 24 September 1423, he was appointed during the papacy of Pope Martin V as Bishop of Muro Lucano.
He served as Bishop of Muro Lucano until his resignation in 1443.

While bishop, he was the principal consecrator of Antonio Guidotti, Bishop of Conversano (1424).

References

External links and additional sources
 (for Chronology of Bishops) 
 (for Chronology of Bishops) 
 (for Chronology of Bishops) 
 (for Chronology of Bishops) 

15th-century Italian Roman Catholic bishops
Bishops appointed by Pope Innocent VII
Bishops appointed by Pope Martin V